Banty is an unincorporated community in Bryan County, Oklahoma, United States.

It is five miles north of Bennington and had a post office from July 31, 1901 to July 5, 1949.  At the time of its founding, Banty was located in Blue County, Choctaw Nation.

References

Unincorporated communities in Bryan County, Oklahoma
Unincorporated communities in Oklahoma